The Devil's Game (lit. "The Game") is a 2008 South Korean film.

Plot 
Struggling artist Min Hee-do (Shin Ha-kyun), is offered three billion won to bet his life to a game against a rich old man, Kang No-sik (Byun Hee-bong), who is dying from a terminal illness. The game is for each man to dial a random phone number and guess if the person who answers will be male or female. He loses the bet, and after a monthlong brain operation, he wakes up to find that they have swapped bodies.

Cast 
 Shin Ha-kyun ... Min Hee-do
 Byun Hee-bong ... Kang No-sik
 Lee Hye-young ... Lee Hye-rin, No-sik's wife
 Son Hyun-joo ... Min Tae-seok, Hee-do's uncle
 Lee Eun-sung ... Joo Eun-ah, Hee-do's girlfriend
 Jang Hang-sun ... Park Chang-ha
 Kim Hyeok ... Secretary Mr. Ahn
 Choo Sang-rok ... Dr. Kim
 Maeng Bong-hak ... Trustee Mr. Yoon
 Jo Cheong-ho ... President Kim

Release 
The Devil's Game was released in South Korea on 31 January 2008, and topped the box office on its opening weekend with 361,650 admissions.

References

External links 
  
 
 
 

2008 films
2000s Korean-language films
South Korean thriller drama films
2000s South Korean films